A pack is a social group of conspecific canines. Packs aren't formed by all canines, especially small sized canines like the Red fox. The number of members in a pack and their social behavior varies from species to species. Social structure is very important in a pack. Every pack member will have a position and a role to play. Canine packs are led by a breeding pair, consisting of the alpha male and the alpha female.

Pack behavior in specific species
African wild dogs (Lycaon pictus) live and hunt in packs. Males assist in raising the pups, and remain with their pack for life, while the females leave their birth pack at about the age of two and a half years old to join a pack with no females. Males outnumber the females in a pack, and usually only one female is present to breed with all males. African wild dogs are not territorial, and they hunt cooperatively in their packs, running down large game and tearing it apart. They cooperate in caring for wounded and sick pack members as well as their young.

Gray wolves (Canis lupus) usually live in packs that consist of the adult parents and their offspring of perhaps the last 2 or 3 years. The adult parents are usually unrelated and other unrelated wolves may sometimes join the pack. Wolves usually hunt in packs, but they hunt alone in the spring and summer months when there is plenty of prey available. They are found in both Eurasia and North America.

Black-backed jackals (Canis mesomelas) in Southern and Eastern Africa and coyotes (Canis latrans) in North America have a single long-term mate, but usually hunt alone or in pairs. Both parents care for the young, and the parents and their current offspring are the pack. They occasionally cooperate in larger packs to hunt large game.

The Ethiopian wolf (Canis simensis) pack members hunt for rodents alone and come together mainly to defend their territory from rival packs.

Corsac foxes sometimes form packs, unlike some other fox species.

Pack behavior in grey wolves 

Wolves are pack animals known for forming affiliative bonds within the pack hierarchy. Wolves in packs are known for playing with one another. It has been observed that the playing between wolves are not random: it may be a reflection of the relationships present in the pack, reflecting any tension, cooperation, and competition present. Tensions are noted to become higher around breeding season where the cost and benefits are weighed against each other. Female wolves are known for being the main initiators of affiliative interactions, though a small percentage of males will initiate affiliative interactions. The omega male is not a target of any affiliative interaction. In other studies, researchers have separated the most dominant wolf from the most subordinate wolves. It was recorded that the dominant wolf spent less time sleeping and showed more behavioral stress compared to the omega wolf. The dominant wolf was reported to rest in the section of his enclosure closest to his pack. Furthermore, researchers noted that younger, more subordinate wolves appear to have less attachment to their pack compared to their higher ranking compatriots.

Wolves' cooperation is essential for tasks such as hunting and protecting young, though the level of attachment present in the pack are not necessarily equal. The majority of wolves are known for dispersing from their birth pack; this makes measuring attachment behavior within the packs difficult. Though there are cases in which wolves leave their pack, typically when accompanying siblings of the same sex. This behavior is suggested to be a form of adaptive behavior that benefits both pack mates in future conflict.

All individuals benefit from being a member of the wolf pack; the weak are supported by the efforts of stronger wolves, and higher ranking individuals enjoy better and larger kills than could be taken on their own. Protection is granted by sheer number, and larger, more plentiful territory can be won and sustained. Care and protection of young is shared, and knowledge can be passed down through generations, creating a unique culture within each group

The pack is typically a nuclear family unit. It often consists of 5–10 (though in areas of high prey abundance can be up to 20) mostly related individuals, specifically consisting of a typically unrelated breeding pair also known as the alphas, their offspring, and occasionally a handful of other wolves which can be related or not. Membership may be fluid and is subject to change. Outside wolves may be shunned or, more rarely, accepted, depending on the specific circumstances. Genetic variability can become limited within such an interrelated group, and so conditions for gene flow must exist. Outside wolves can provide these opportunities. A pack may be accepting of another wolf into their group if it is a distant relative, if reproduction rates are low due to loss or infertility of an alpha, or if their numbers are significantly reduced.

Characterization of wolves into dominance hierarchies of alpha, beta, and omega were based on behavioral studies of unrelated wolves in captivity, and this assemblage largely does not apply to natural wolf packs, which are familial units.

The lone wolf 
These singular outside wolves, often referred to as lone wolves, are vulnerable to food scarcity and territorial attacks, and generally comprise less than 15% of the total wolf population. Lone wolves usually result from sexually mature offspring leaving their parental pack, though may also occur if harassed subordinates chose to disperse. In times of prey scarcity, low ranking wolves may choose to go off on their own if the pack cannot supply sufficient food. These lone wolves may then attempt to join into an existing wolf pack or, more commonly, find a mate and begin a new pack family as the alphas.

The breeding pair ("alphas") 
Within the wolf pack, the breeding pair or the dominant breeding pair (in packs with multiples breeders), often referred to in familiar language as the "alpha pair" or the "alphas wolves", are typically the wolves in the family unit which breed and produce offspring; they are the matriarch and patriarch of the family. It was previously believed to be common for an aging or sick alpha to be replaced by one of their offspring, but more recent studies have shown this incestuous behavior to be very rare.

The pups 

Importance of the alpha is rivaled only by that of the pups. The fundamental purpose of the pack is the successful production of offspring, and so raising of the litter is a collaborative venture – all members contribute to their development. In times of scarcity, the breeding pair will often prioritize the care of the pups, and preferentially feed the youngest wolves first. Despite this committed involvement, pup mortality is high, with researchers citing that only roughly 30% survive their first year of life. Those who survive, however, grow up with the added advantage of being surrounded by numerous care-takers and teachers. There exists a culture within wolf packs, and this is passed on to the offspring by the elders of the group.  Pups learn something from each member of the pack, and attain the vital social skills required to create those powerful bonds upon which wolf societal structure relies.

Dominance and the "alpha wolf"

Animals which typically predominate over others are associated with the term alpha. Among pack-living wolves, alpha wolves are the genetic parents of most cubs in the pack. Such access to mating females creates strong selective pressure for intra-sex competition.

Wolves show deference to the alpha pair in their pack by allowing them to allocate the distribution of food, typically preferentially feeding the youngest wolves. Wolves use eye contact and posture as an indicator of dominance or submission, which are largely age-based; these postures are rare except in relation to food, as described previously. The smaller and more nuclear a pack is, the status of alpha is less likely to be obtained through fighting, and young wolves instead leave the pack to find a mate and produce offspring of their own. Larger or less-nuclear packs may operate differently and possess more complex and flexible social structures.

In the case of other wild canids, the alpha male may not have exclusive access to the alpha female; moreover, other pack members may guard the maternity den used by the alpha female; as with the African wild dog, Lycaon pictus.

As dominant roles may be deemed normal among social species with extended parenting, it has been suggested that the additional term alpha is not required merely to describe dominance due to its ubiquity, but should be reserved for where they are the predominant pack progenitor. For instance, wolf biologist L. David Mech stated: ...calling a wolf an alpha is usually no more appropriate than referring to a human parent or a doe deer as an alpha. Any parent is dominant to its young offspring, so alpha adds no information. Why not refer to an alpha female as the female parent, the breeding female, the matriarch, or simply the mother? Such a designation emphasizes not the animal's dominant status, which is trivial information, but its role as pack progenitor, which is critical information. The one use we may still want to reserve for alpha is in the relatively few large wolf packs  multiple litters. ... In such cases the older breeders are probably dominant to the younger breeders and perhaps can more appropriately be called the alphas. ... The point here is not so much the terminology but what the terminology falsely implies: a rigid, force-based dominance hierarchy.

Use in dog training 
One of the most persistent but disputed theories in dog training literature is the idea of the alpha wolf, an individual gray wolf who uses body language and, when needed, physical force to maintain its dominance within the wolf pack. The idea was first reported in early wolf research. It was subsequently adopted by dog trainers. Later research has disputed the theory, pointing out that it was based on the behavior of captive packs consisting of unrelated individuals, while in nature a pack is usually made up by members of a family.

The term alpha was popularized as early as 1976 in the dog training book How to Be Your Dog's Best Friend (Monks of New Skete), which introduced the idea of the alpha roll, a technique for punishing unwanted dog behaviours. Psychologist and dog trainer Stanley Coren in the 2001 book How to Speak Dog wrote, "You are the alpha dog... You must communicate that you are the pack leader and dominant".

It has been suggested that the use of such techniques may have more to do with human psychology than with dog behavior; "dominance hierarchies and dominance disputes and testing are a fundamental characteristic of all social groups... But perhaps only we humans learn to use punishment primarily to gain for ourselves the reward of being dominant.

Most leading veterinary and animal behavior associations, and most contemporary trainers would agree, advocating the use of rewards to teach commands and encourage good communication between owners and their pets. Many modern practices dictate the abandonment of outdated "pack" methods. Some canine behaviorists suggest that kind, efficient training uses games to teach commands which can be utilised to benefit the owner's everyday life.

See also
 Pack hunter
 Dog behavior

References

 
Dogs
Wolves
Dog training and behavior